Mindy Grossman (born September 8, 1957) is the former CEO of WW International (formerly Weight Watchers). The Financial Times listed her in the Top 50 Women In World Business in 2010 and 2011, and she has been ranked among Forbes 100 Most Powerful Women In The World for the years 2009, 2011, 2012, and 2013. In 2014 she was ranked 22 in Fortunes Top People in Business.

Grossman began her career in 1977 in the menswear industry. After 28 years in the apparel industry, including 9 highly successful years at Ralph Lauren Corporation and 6 equally successful years at Nike, she became the CEO of HSN in 2006. She aggressively reinvented and relaunched the brand, took HSN public in 2008, and oversaw its multi-billion-dollar retail portfolio and multimedia expansion. In July 2017 she left HSN to become the CEO of WW International. She stepped down from her role as CEO of WW after the first quarter of 2022.

Early life and education
Mindy Grossman was born September 8, 1957. Her adoptive parents were Donald and Elaine Waldman, a Jewish produce dealer and homemaker on Long Island, New York, who had married young but had been unable to have children.

She attended Manhattanville College in Westchester County, New York, and transferred to George Washington University in Washington, D.C. She intended to go to law school after graduation. However, in her senior year at George Washington University, she broke off her engagement to her high-school boyfriend and dropped her plans to attend law school, and instead moved to New York City to go into the fashion industry.

Career

1977–1991
Grossman moved to New York City in 1977, and was offered a job working for a company called Manhattan International. It was a menswear conglomerate at the time, and she was an assistant to the president of their international division. From 1978 to 1980, she was an account executive at Jeffrey Banks menswear. From 1980 to 1981, she was an account executive at Ron Chereskin menswear. From 1981 to 1985, she was a regional sales manager at Merona, and then vice-president of sales at Jeffrey Banks; both Merona and Jeffrey Banks were at the time divisions of Oxford Industries.

From 1985 to 1988, Grossman worked for WilliWear by Willi Smith. She started out as Vice President of Sales and in 1987 became Vice President of Menswear.

From 1988 to 1991 she was Vice President of Sales and Merchandising at Tommy Hilfiger. She was in nearly on the ground floor at Tommy Hilfiger, which had been incorporated in 1985. Grossman later recalled, "At the time, it was a small company, and sales were meteoric. They went from around $38 million to $350 million."

1991–2006

Ralph Lauren
From 1991 to 2000, Grossman worked for brands by Ralph Lauren. From 1991 to 1994, she was President of Chaps Ralph Lauren, a division of Warnaco, Inc., and she was Senior Vice President of Menswear for Warnaco, Inc. during those years as well. Chaps was Ralph Lauren's midprice department-store brand; She turned around the Chaps division and grew its annual revenues from $26 million to $250 million.

She was vice-president of New Business Development at Polo Ralph Lauren Corporation from 1994 to 1995. During that period, she developed new brand concepts, including Polo Jeans. She convinced Lauren that in order to attract customers at a younger age he needed to embrace new ideas, and that Polo Jeans Company was a good way to make lifelong customers out of a younger audience. Grossman calls starting Polo Jeans "my start-up experience"; she was its president and CEO from 1995 to 2000, launched the brand in 1996,  and took it from a standing start to a $450 million business, building it into the leading department store status denim brand.

Nike
In 2000, Grossman joined Nike, Inc., where she served as Vice President of Global Apparel from 2000 to 2006, overseeing its worldwide multi-billion-dollar apparel business. Nike CEO Phil Knight had brought her in to revive Nike's sagging apparel business, capitalizing on her expertise in fashion, brand strategy, product development, and retail space management.

In her capacity as head of global apparel, she oversaw global strategic planning; product development; and global apparel manufacturing, operations, sourcing, merchandising, advanced innovation, quality assurance, and compliance and sustainability. She was also responsible for Nike's women's business. She aggressively and successfully reengineered the entire apparel organization, and created three sub-brands for Nike apparel: Nike Performance, targeted to athletes and aspirational consumers; Nike Active, a line to be worn from gym to street; and Nike Fusion, apparel with higher-performance fabrics and aggressive styling. Under her leadership, Nike also rolled out new NikeWomen stores, launched NikeWomen catalogues, and started a new division called Fitness Dance. She advanced Nike's apparel innovation agenda, led the development and growth of the global women's business, and created and co-chaired Nike's Global Women's Leadership Council.

Grossman was credited with showing a footwear company how to be an apparel company. She brought her strong fashion background to Nike's apparel and regenerated it, devoting much of her energy to the company's weaker women's wear business. Nike's apparel business's annual revenue was $2.7 billion when she joined in 2000; by the end of fiscal year 2005 she had grown it to $4.1 billion, which was 32% of Nike brand revenues.

2006 to 2017: HSN

Arrival at HSN
By 2006, after six years at Nike, Grossman desired a CEO position, preferably in a company where she did not need to commute across the country as she did at Nike. Nike had recently appointed its own new CEO and a new president, so she actively looked to find an opportunity in another company, seeking this time one that was direct-to-consumer, entrepreneurial but not a start-up, and one that she could transform by taking advantage of new technological advances. A recruiter approached her about IAC/InterActiveCorp (IAC), the parent company of HSN, Inc., and after studying HSN's broadcasts she realized that, in her words, "HSN really needed to become more of a lifestyle network that would inspire people through products". Her vision was to offer inspiring lifestyle programming, particularly with charismatic celebrities, with all the products for sale – rather than the usual dry and old-fashioned standard sales format.

She took the idea to Barry Diller, the head of IAC, and even though she had no television experience, no direct-to-consumer experience, and no experience in most of the product categories HSN sold, he hired her. In April 2006, Grossman was appointed CEO of IAC Retailing, overseeing HSN, the catalog company Cornerstone Brands, Shoebuy.com, and IAC's international retailing operations.

HSN had had seven CEOs in the previous 10 years, and according to Grossman the company, offices, and employees seemed downtrodden and frozen in time. One of her first actions was to throw out all the old, broken, or dirty office furniture and give all employees Aeron chairs. In order to focus on revitalizing HSN, she closed IAC's failing UK auction business, sold its German shopping channel, closed the down-market DirecTV clearance-shopping channel, and put another executive in charge of Cornerstone brands. She also eliminated negative or "toxic" employees, sought out committed, knowledgeable people within and outside the company to head up important divisions, and ensured that all employees were on board with the company's new vision.

She also found that the network and brand itself was a "very stagnant, linear, non-immersive experience". By October 2006 she rolled out HSN's new brand image, tagline, vision statement, customer intention, and advertising. The company's new manifesto was "to create a new lifestyle experience for consumers". To implement the plan, she stopped selling $150 million worth of unsuitable brands, and worked hard to entice higher-end brands, and new personalities to sell products. Among many others, early on she recruited Sephora, Emeril Lagasse, and Todd English to sell on air. She also aired a two-hour fashion show of high-end apparel. In addition, she brought the company's call centers back to the U.S. from overseas.

HSN relaunch and taking the company public
By mid 2007 the relaunch and redesign of HSN's channel, website, and campus were in effect, and the business started to turn around. In November of that year, Diller decided to break up IAC into several of its constituent companies, and to spin off HSN, Inc. as a public company via an IPO with Grossman as CEO. The IPO launched in August 2008. A few weeks later the Lehman Brothers collapse occurred, with the subsequent stock-market plunge and recession. Grossman kept HSN afloat and thriving during the tenuous recessional years of 2008 and 2009 via intense economies and stringent dedication to her vision, and by tailoring HSN's marketing to her customers' needs to economize.

She continued to aggressively transform, redefine, and reinvent the HSN brand, improving its demographics and increasing the value of its stock from $10 at its IPO in August 2008 to $55 a share in 2014. HSN's success fostered  the launch of a second 24-hour television channel, HSN2, in 2010. Grossman's turn-around approach was multi-faceted: she upgraded product level to high-end products; aggressively and preemptively implemented numerous digital and mobile access options; made the shopping experience fun, immersive, entertaining, creative, informative, exciting, interactive, and inspiring; and brought on board major celebrities and high-end fashion designers to sell their lines, most of them exclusive to HSN.

Under her leadership HSN became a multi-platform business, providing a seamless shopping experience across multiple channels and platforms, accessible anytime and anywhere, that was entertaining, fun, and exciting. Forbes and Fortune termed the new brand a "hybrid" – a media, entertainment, technology, and retail business.

Determined to stay ahead of the curve on the technology front, Grossman also introduced new HSN venues including Shop by Remote (television remote control shopping), HSN Arcade (online games), Video on Demand, HSN Live, shopping via YouTube, and in-flight shopping. She overhauled HSN's website and made HSN a major e-commerce presence; as of 2013 HSN.com is one of the top 10 most-trafficked e-commerce sites. She evolved HSN from a linear network to a multi-platform business,  creating a "boundaryless" retail; according to Fast Company, nearly half the HSN's revenue comes through digital platforms.

She recruited major celebrities such as Jennifer Lopez, Queen Latifah, Mariah Carey, Iman, P. Diddy, Padma Lakshmi, Martha Stewart, Jessica Simpson, Keith Urban, Nicki Minaj, Mary J. Blige, and Serena Williams, and major cosmetics companies such as Lancôme and Stila, to appear on the network and sell their own brands of merchandise, most of them exclusively created for HSN. She brought in high-end fashion designers to sell exclusive fashion lines on the network, garnering Grossman and HSN a front row at Fashion Week. She also created partnerships with major companies like Disney and other Hollywood studios to sell merchandise, invited movie and television-series tie-ins, and aired live concerts by singers such as Rod Stewart and Randy Travis.

HSN became a Fortune 1000 company in 2009. As of 2014, Grossman is one of only 51 women who lead a Fortune 1000 company. In 2015, Fortune published an article stating that from 2002 through 2014, Fortune 1000 companies led by women have performed three times better than the S&P 500, and that HSN's returns since its IPO were one of the top two, even despite the stock-market meltdown which immediately followed its initial public offering. Other retailers, including Penney's, Target, and Avon, have attempted to recruit Grossman to head their companies.

2017 to present: WW

Arrival at WW
On April 26, 2017, Weight Watchers (now WW) announced that Mindy Grossman would take over as CEO in July 2017, replacing former CEO James Chambers who resigned from the company in the fall of 2016. Once in office, she said that her plan included a push beyond dieting and into well-being, as well as a partnership with Oprah Winfrey, who holds almost 15% of WW's shares and sits on its board of directors. She resigned her position early in 2022.

Directorships and advisories
Grossman has been a director of HSN, Inc. since it went public in August 2008. She has been a director of Bloomin’ Brands since 2012.
She serves on the Board of Directors of, and as of 2015 is Vice Chair of, the National Retail Federation. She also serves on the Board of Directors of, and as of 2015 is Chair of, the National Retail Federation Foundation, the charitable arm of the National Retail Federation.

She is the chair of the advisory board of Fashion Institute of Technology’s Executive Women in Fashion. She is a member of the Industry Advisory Board of the Jay H. Baker Retailing Center at the Wharton School of Business. She is also an advisor at the venture capital firm Metamorphic Ventures.

Grossman is on the Board of Directors of the United States Fund for UNICEF. She also founded and spearheads HSN Cares, the philanthropic arm of HSN.

In June 2017, Grossman joined the Board of Directors of sports apparel e-commerce retailer Fanatics.

Awards and honors
 Forbes 100 Most Powerful Women (2009)
Financial Times Top 50 women in world business (2010)
Financial Times Top 50 women in world business (2011)
Forbes World's 100 most powerful women (2011)
Fast Companys Top 100 Most Creative People in Business (2011)
Woman of Achievement Award from the Women's Project Theater (2011)
Corporate Innovator of the Year at the Ernst & Young Entrepreneur of the Year Florida Awards (2011)
Business Insiders 50 Sexiest CEOs Alive (2012)
Forbes World's 100 most powerful women (2012)
Forbes World's 100 most powerful women (2013)
Matrix Award (2013)<ref>"Matrix Monday: Announcing the Second of Our Esteemed 2013 Matrix Award Honorees: Mindy Grossman" . New York Women in Communications.</ref>Fortunes Top People in Business #22 (2014)
Women's Entrepreneurship Day Pioneer Award for Philanthropy (2016) 

 Personal life 
Mindy is married to Neil D. Grossman, an investment manager and investment analyst and the creator of Bloomberg''s Neilytics. They have one child.

References

External links
"Culture Trumps Strategy" – 48-minute talk by Grossman at the Stanford Graduate School of Business (video, 2014)

American retail chief executives
Chief executives in the media industry
American women chief executives
Nike, Inc. people
Manhattanville College alumni
George Washington University alumni
People from Long Island
People from St. Petersburg, Florida
20th-century American Jews
1957 births
Living people
21st-century American Jews